Sideros, is the outermost of a chain of two island-like peninsulas forming, with Itanos promontory, Cape Sidero. There are ruins of an ancient temple of Athena destroyed by a tsunami and facilities of the Kyriamadi Naval Station. Kyriamadi is the other island-like peninsula in the chain. Administratively the cape lies within the Itanos municipal unit, Sitia Municipality, Lasithi regional unit, and Crete region.

Etymology

Sideros first appears in 16th century maps as Cauo S. Sideros, a Venetian name for capes such as San Sidero of Corfu. In Venetian Sidero is the common form of Isidore. Which St. Isidore applies is uncertain. Otherwise Sidero means "iron," and there are many place names that probably mean it. There is, however, no Saint Iron.

Geography
Sideros is a roughly ovoid quasi-island with a long axis of  bearing 65° (from N), and a short axis of  bearing 155°. The maximum elevation is  roughly in the center, the highest of the entire cape. The rocky terrain of the isthmus and the boulder terrain of the island make off-road walking difficult, although the beaches are excellent.

The coastline is coves (or the older term, "ports," which may not have any facilities) alternating with headlands. Much of the coast is cliffs bordered by strip beaches of fine sand. Sidero is unaccessible to the public except at specified times. A checkpoint and barbed wire gate the road with a sign that the peninsula is under military jurisdiction. On the west of the isthmus is Kyriamadi Bay (Port Kereamathi). The military base sits upon its north coast, with both an ancient and a modern jetty visible from the air. Facilities, including a helicopter pad, are built into the steep slopes. Photographs are discouraged, so pictures are scarce.

The waters around Sidero are highly dangerous to passing ships, although small-boat activity is frequent (water sports, beaching, etc.). Professional works on navigation recommend giving the cape a wide berth (a few miles). Looking from Kyriamadi Bay around Sidero in a CW direction, one finds the following "insular formations."

Spitfire rock
Depth is 1 fathom or less. Location is in the road between Sidero and the Dionysades. The name was assigned by Thomas Spratt in his 1852 survey of Crete aboard  HMS Spitfire, under his command. He was proceeding through the passage between Sideros and the Dionysades, he said, with what he thought was all due circumspection, but in the centre, when his guide, Captain Manias, sometime revolutionary and pirate, warned him to steer on the Dionysiades side to avoid the reef. In commemoration of the event he named the rock after the ship, although he gives no further insight into his line of reasoning.

Sidero or Strongylos Island
The names of these formations vary by convention, this "island" sometimes being called an "islet." It should not be confused with the peninsula of Sideros itself, which also sometimes is called an island, nor should it be confused with another insular formation south of Crete called Strongylo, "round." The "round" etymology is straightforward and descriptive, while Sidero is named after the cape it is near.

Maps

See also
List of islands of Greece

References

Reference bibliography

External links

 Photographs of the cape

Landforms of Lasithi
Uninhabited islands of Crete
Islands of Greece